Prince Hlela (born 28 May 1984) is a South African footballer who played as a defender in the Premier Soccer League.

Club career
Hlela began his professional career at Free State Stars and had a loan spell at Carara Kicks. He has also played for Bloemfontein Celtic, AmaZulu and SuperSport United.  Hlela joined newly promoted Premier Soccer League team Polokwane City in September 2013.

International career
He made his debut for South Africa on 14 May 2011 versus Tanzania in an international friendly. He came on as a substitute in the third minute of injury time after the 90th minute. Other players to make their debuts in the game were Thabo Matlaba, Lehlohonolo Majoro, Thandani Ntshumayelo and Eric Mathoho.

References

External links

1984 births
Living people
People from Lesedi Local Municipality
Sportspeople from Gauteng
Zulu people
Bloemfontein Celtic F.C. players
South African soccer players
South Africa international soccer players
Free State Stars F.C. players
AmaZulu F.C. players
Association football defenders
SuperSport United F.C. players
Polokwane City F.C. players
Carara Kicks F.C. players
South African Premier Division players
National First Division players